David J. O'Connell (August 21, 1916 – January 16, 1996) was an American editor, producer and production manager. He won an Primetime Emmy Award and was nominated for three more in the categories Outstanding Drama Series and Outstanding Single Program for his work on the television program Marcus Welby, M.D. and also the television film Vanished. 

O'Connell died in January 1996 of a lung disease and emphysema in Santa Monica, California, at the age of 79.

References

External links 

1916 births
1996 deaths
People from New York (state)
Deaths from lung disease
Deaths from emphysema
American television editors
American television producers
Primetime Emmy Award winners